"The Ex-Girlfriend" is the first episode of the sitcom Seinfelds second season and the show's sixth episode overall. The episode was first broadcast on NBC in the United States on January 23, 1991, after being postponed for one week due to the start of the First Gulf War. During the course of the show, George Costanza breaks up with his girlfriend Marlene and leaves some books in her apartment. He persuades his friend Jerry to retrieve them. Jerry starts dating Marlene, who annoys him as much as she did George, but he finds himself unable to break up with her because she has a "psycho-sexual" hold on him.

Co-written by the series' co-creators Larry David and Jerry Seinfeld, the episode was inspired by one of David's personal experiences. Directed by Tom Cherones, "The Ex-Girlfriend" was the first episode of the show filmed at CBS Studio Center in Los Angeles, California (and would stay there for the remainder of the show's run), the previous season having been filmed at Desilu Cahuenga in Hollywood. The episode received a Nielsen rating of 10.9/17 and was positively received by critics.

Plot
George wants to break up with his girlfriend Marlene, whose tendency to drag out conversations and phone messages irritates him. After an emotional split, he realizes he has left some books in her apartment. Jerry tries to convince George that he does not need the books, as he has already read them, but George nevertheless persuades Jerry to get them for him. Jerry meets with Marlene so he can retrieve the books. She tells him that she and Jerry can still be friends, despite her recent break-up. Jerry and Marlene start dating; though Jerry finds her just as annoying as George did, and fears that George will be enraged when he finds out they are dating, he finds she has a "psycho-sexual" hold on him.

Elaine is upset that a man she was once friendly acquaintances with now no longer even gives her a nod of acknowledgment when she sees him. She eventually builds up the courage to aggressively confront him about this. Inspired by her example, Jerry tells George about Marlene. George tells Jerry he has no problem with him dating Marlene. The following night, Jerry asks Marlene to come up to his apartment, but she breaks up with him. She says she did not think his stand-up comedy act was funny, and she could not date someone if she did not respect what they did.

Cultural references
The episode contains a number of pop culture references. Elaine mentions that a man she knows used to nod at her whenever she saw him, but suddenly stopped, leading her to state, " he went from nods to nothing." This prompts George to hum the Tony Bennett song "Rags to Riches," replacing the chorus with "nods to nothing." During a discussion with Elaine, Jerry mentions the 1958 film The Blob. Jerry also mentions the novel Moby Dick, jokingly stating that "when you read Moby Dick the second time, Ahab and the whale become good friends." After George receives a bill from his chiropractor, he states "75 bucks? What, am I seeing Sinatra in there?"

Production

The episode was written by series co-creators Larry David and Jerry Seinfeld and directed by Tom Cherones. David based the story on a personal experience of his, when he gave a ride home to a woman who had recently dated a friend of his. He would frequently come up with the idea for an episode and make it into a teleplay with Seinfeld's help; in a 1991 interview with the Los Angeles Times, Seinfeld stated: "Most of the stories are from [David's] life. He just has a tremendous wellspring of ideas. I mean, he just fills notebooks with ideas and I try to help him, but Larry is really the designer of the show." David Sims of The A.V. Club commented, "Seinfeld started its second season, its first real season after a four-episode test run, very strongly with "The Ex-Girlfriend", and it is the first time we really see George as the character we know and love, that weird dark shadow of Larry David's mind who behaves as no functioning human being honestly could."

Among the actresses who auditioned for the part of Marlene were Amy Yasbeck; Jeri Ryan, who would go on to star in Star Trek: Voyager; and Heidi Swedberg. Swedberg was later cast as Susan Ross for Seinfelds fourth season. Tracy Kolis, who at the time was known for her appearance in the soap opera All My Children, was eventually cast for the part. She reappeared later in the season six episode "The Soup", in which she portrayed a waitress named Kelly. Norman Brenner, who worked as Michael Richards' stand-in on the show for all nine seasons, appears as an extra during the second scene, walking by twice in different clothing.

The first table read of the episode took place on October 17, 1990. It was filmed in front of a studio audience six days later, on October 23. Seinfeld's stand-up performances were filmed on October 29, 1990, along with the performances used in "The Pony Remark" and "The Busboy." Filming of the episode took place on stage 19 of the CBS Studio Center in Studio City, Los Angeles. "The Ex-Girlfriend" was the first episode to be filmed there, as the majority of season one was filmed in a studio called Desilu Cahuenga, in Hollywood, where The Dick Van Dyke Show had also been filmed. Tom Azzari designed the sets for the second season of the show, and was able to re-use various sets from the first season, thanks to Castle Rock Entertainment's decision to store them in a large storage facility. The chiropractor's waiting room, in which George believes he was charged too much for a visit, was the only new set which appeared in the episode.

Although the scenes in Monk's Cafe were filmed at the CBS Studio Center, the exterior of Tom's Restaurant, a diner at Broadway and 112th Street in Manhattan was used as the exterior for the cafe. The second scene of the episode, which takes place on a street, was filmed on CBS Studio Center's "New York Street", a set that consists of four very small store fronts. During seasons one to five, "New York Street" was the only set the writers could use to replicate New York City. This scene, and additional scenes which take place in Jerry's car, were filmed on October 22 from 5:00 to 8:30 p.m. One or two members of the crew shook the car to give the impression that it was moving, though it never actually was. Other crew members would move lights around the set to simulate street lights or headlights of other cars. Behind the car, two lights on a wheeled stand were placed to give the impression that there was a car behind it. This technique is called "poor man's process", because it is cheaper than other ways of achieving the effect. The show had previously experimented with this technique in the season one episode "The Stake Out".

Some scenes in the episode were cut prior to broadcast. The opening scene in Jerry's car, in which George discusses breaking up with Marlene, originally had George proposing that he would stage his own kidnapping while walking down the street with Marlene, then hide out until she had given up on him. Although it was cut before the episode's broadcast, this scene was included on the Seinfeld Volume 1 DVD set. Another scene which was cut featured Jerry's neighbor Kramer entering Jerry's apartment carrying a plate with cantaloupe on toothpicks. Originally, the scene in which Jerry tells George that he is dating Marlene took place in a library, with a librarian repeatedly shushing George and Jerry and kicking them out of the library at the end of the scene. The location was changed to Monk's Cafe because the dialogue had nothing to do with a library.

Reception
"The Ex-Girlfriend" was first broadcast on NBC on January 23, 1991, after being postponed for one week due to the start of the First Gulf War. The episode gained a Nielsen rating of 10.9 and an audience share of 17, meaning that 10.9% of American households watched the episode and 17% of all televisions in use at the time were tuned into it. Although Seinfeld would be considered a hit show by today's standards, NBC was disappointed with its ratings, and, after three weeks, put the show on a two-month break.

Critics reacted positively to the episode. Joseph P. Kahn, a critic for the Wilmington Morning Star, called the episode's writing and acting "anything but hackneyed" and stated, "One safe prediction, Seinfeld will be here for a good long run this time around (referring to how its first season only had five episodes)." Joyce Millman of Salon.com stated that she disliked Seinfelds pilot episode, but after seeing a scene from "The Ex-Girlfriend" in which Jerry and Kramer discuss returning fruit, she was "awed by Seinfeld and co-creator/writer Larry David's brilliant grasp of, A) working-class Jewish craziness, and, B) the absurd humor of the deeply mundane."

In a review of the episode, Jon Burlingame of The Spokesman-Review stated, "Seinfeld is an offbeat take on the standard sitcom concept. While rarely hilarious, it's often smart and amusing." In his review of the episode, Chicago Tribune critic Rick Kogan stated, "Hip without posing, it delivers its comedy in sharp and spectacular style".

Mike Flaherty and Mary Kaye Schilling of Entertainment Weekly called "The Ex-Girlfriend" "The series' most multifaceted (if not most engaging) narrative so far", and graded it with a B. David Sims gave the episode an A, writing, "George is really the most revolutionary character: he's often repulsive and pathetic, but here these are traits we heartily enjoy and sympathize with and want more of... The best thing about this episode is that Jerry almost immediately getting with George's ex-girlfriend creates no drama in the group, though it would on almost any other sitcom."

A relatively negative review came from Chicago Sun-Times critic Lon Grahnke, who criticized Seinfeld's part in the episode: "this comedy series must ride on the shoulders of its star. And Seinfeld spends too much time shrugging". He also noted Dreyfus was not granted screentime, as opposed to Richards, whose acting performances he described as "get[ting] tiresome". Overall, Grahnke commented "At his best, Seinfeld draws a chuckle or two from his middle-brow remarks on modern life and its perplexing contradictions. At his worst, the comedian shows the smugness of a detached star who can mechanically control the level of laughter that greets whatever quip he may utter."

References

External links

 Episode script
 
 "The Ex-Girlfriend" on Sony Pictures

1991 American television episodes
Seinfeld (season 2) episodes
Television episodes written by Larry David
Television episodes written by Jerry Seinfeld